Utah's 4th congressional district is a congressional district created by the state legislature as a result of reapportionment by Congress after the 2010 Census showed population increases in the state relative to other states. Prior to 2010 reapportionment, Utah had three congressional districts.

Some 85 percent of the new district is concentrated in Salt Lake County and it includes a portion of Salt Lake City, which is shared with the 2nd and 3rd districts; it also includes parts of Utah, Juab, and Sanpete counties. Candidates first appeared on the 2012 ballot.

As a result of redistricting, the 2012 party candidates included Democratic U.S. Congressman Jim Matheson, who had previously represented Utah's 2nd congressional district from 2001 to 2013. The Republican nominee was Mia Love, mayor of Saratoga Springs and running for Congress for the first time. She won the Republican nomination in 2012 over two state representatives, Stephen Sandstrom and Carl Wimmer, at the Republican state convention.

Democratic candidate Matheson narrowly won the election against Love on November 6, 2012, and represented Utah's 4th congressional district until January 2015. He decided not to seek re-election. In 2014, Mia Love ran again for the seat and won in the general election, defeating Democratic candidate Doug Owens. She became the first Haitian American and the first black female Republican elected to Congress, as well as the first black person of either sex elected to Congress from Utah.

In the 2018 elections, Love ran for a third term, losing to Salt Lake County mayor Ben McAdams by 694 votes out of almost 270,000. As a result of McAdams's election, the district became the most Republican district in the country to be represented by a Democrat. In 2020, Republican Burgess Owens narrowly defeated McAdams to regain the congressional seat for the Republican Party.

Recent election results from statewide races 
Results Under Current Lines (Since 2023)

Results Under Old Lines (2013-2023)

List of members representing the district

Election results

2012

2014

2016

2018

2020

2022

References

Notes

External links

4
Constituencies established in 2013
2013 establishments in Utah